The 1932 Georgia Bulldogs football team represented the Georgia Bulldogs of the University of Georgia during the 1932 college football season. The Bulldogs completed the season with a 2–5–2 record.

Schedule

References

Georgia
Georgia Bulldogs football seasons
Georgia Bulldogs football